"Restart" is a song by American recording soul/jazz artist Bilal. Released in 2010, it is the official lead single from his studio album Airtight's Revenge. Produced by Bilal and Steve McKie, and released as an EP with remixes produced by Deadelus.

Music video
The video for “Restart” was directed by Michael Sterling Eaton. “Eaton’s muted color palette and stark imagery paired with Bilal’s vibrant vocals, make for audio and visual magic. He combines oddball imagery surrounding a masked man and shots of Bilal performing, all of which are covered by an ever-changing color palette.

References

External links
plugresearch.combilal

2010 singles
Bilal (American singer) songs
2009 songs
Songs written by Bilal (American singer)
Plug Research singles